Alexander McMinn (28 August 1842 – 21 October 1919) was a New Zealand teacher, journalist and newspaper proprietor. He was born in Dunlady, County Down, Ireland on 28 August 1842.

References

People from County Down
1842 births
1919 deaths
New Zealand schoolteachers
New Zealand writers
Northern Ireland emigrants to New Zealand
Irish emigrants to New Zealand (before 1923)